Nathan Tasker is a prominent Christian singer/songwriter from Australia. He was named 2006 "Artist of the Year" and awarded "Song of The Year" by the Australian Christian Music Charts. He has written, recorded and produced several gospel albums. His song "Like You Love Me" reached No. 1 on the TRAA weekly Contemporary Top 30. He has also been named "Artist of the Year" for 2011 by the TRAA, with his singles claiming 5th and 6th top songs of the year chart.

Tasker made his first public performance in 1993, performing approximately 1200 times since then.  In addition to music, he is involved in Christian ministry through writing, singing and speaking. He has worked at a variety of venues, participating in events for schools, churches, conventions, prisons and media. Although initially based in Sydney, Tasker visited the United States, Western Europe, the United Kingdom and South Africa annually. Nathan currently resides in Nashville with his wife, Cassie.

As a  Contemporary Christian musician, his songs are not only focused on the Christian message of God's love for mankind, but also cover many aspects of the human condition.

In August 2011 Nathan's wife, Cassie, went into labour prematurely and gave birth to twins who did not survive. Nathan and his wife has since had three kids.

Discography

Albums
Man on a Wire (2014)
The Bell Tower (2013)
Home (2011)
A Star. A Stable. A Saviour. (2009)
Prone to Wander: the hymn project (2007)
Must Be More (2005)
A Look Inside (2003)
life... this side of heaven (1996)

References

External links
Official website
www.christianscampus.com
Profile on Fisher Artist Agency
Interview on Cross Rhythms Christian Music Site

Living people
Australian pop singers
Australian male singers
Year of birth missing (living people)